"Are You Hung Up?" is the opening track on the 1968 album We're Only in It for the Money by The Mothers of Invention.

Song structure
"Are You Hung Up?" is a short montage of dialogue and musique concrète, lasting 1 minute and 24 seconds. It includes stuttering hippie vocals by Eric Clapton, "Uh, out of sight. Are, are you hung up?", engineer Gary Kellgren whispering about Frank Zappa's mighty, omniscient presence in the control room, a brief guitar lick and Jimmy Carl Black saying "Hi, boys and girls, I'm Jimmy Carl Black and I'm the Indian of the group" and then laughing. Black's statement, a catchphrase used frequently by him in concert , is also used on the song "Concentration Moon" and resurfaces on later recordings by the Mothers of Invention.

External links
Lyrics and information
[ Review on allmusic.com]

Frank Zappa songs
1968 songs
Songs written by Frank Zappa
Song recordings produced by Frank Zappa